Laraesima is a genus of longhorn beetles of the subfamily Lamiinae.

 Laraesima albosignata (Bates, 1885)
 Laraesima asperata (Bates, 1885)
 Laraesima brunneoscutellaris (Tippmann, 1960)
 Laraesima densepunctata Breuning, 1950
 Laraesima ecuadorensis Breuning, 1974
 Laraesima fuliginea (Bates, 1885)
 Laraesima hispida (Thomson, 1868)
 Laraesima nitida Monné, 1980
 Laraesima ochreoapicalis Breuning, 1973
 Laraesima pilosa Monné, 1980
 Laraesima scutellaris Thomson, 1868

References

Compsosomatini